Tiina Ranne (born 6 December 1994) is a Finnish ice hockey goaltender, currently playing with KalPa Kuopio of the Naisten Liiga and the Finnish national team. She previously played for Team Oriflame Kuortane, JYP Jyväskylä Naiset, and HPK Kiekkonaiset in the Naisten Liiga and its predecessor, the Naisten SM-sarja.

She participated at the 2016 IIHF Women's World Championship.

References

External links

1994 births
Living people
Finnish women's ice hockey goaltenders
HPK Kiekkonaiset players
JYP Jyväskylä Naiset players
KalPa Naiset players
People from Harjavalta
Sportspeople from Satakunta
Team Kuortane players